Waldbach-Mönichwald is a municipality since 2015 in the Hartberg-Fürstenfeld District of Styria, Austria.

The municipality was created as part of the Styria municipal structural reform,
at the end of 2014, by merging the former towns Waldbach and Mönichwald.

A petition against the merger, raised by the town Waldbach at the constitutional court, was not successful.

Geography

Municipality arrangement 
The municipality territory includes the following six hamlets (populations as of January 2015):
 Arzberg (415)
 Breitenbrunn (81)
 Karnerviertel (567)
 Rieglerviertel (83)
 Schmiedviertel (303)
 Schrimpf (97)

The municipality consists of the five Katastralgemeinden: Arzberg, Karnerviertl, Rieglerviertl, Schmiedviertl and Schrimpf.

Tourism 
The municipality formed, together with Fischbach, Miesenbach, Ratten, Rettenegg, Strallegg, St. Kathrein am Hauenstein, St. Jakob im Walde, Birkfeld, Wenigzell and Vorau, the tourism agency "Joglland-Waldheimat". The base is in the town St. Jakob im Walde.

Politics

Mayor 
In the election for the town council in April 2015, Stefan Hold (ÖVP) from Mönichwald was elected as the first mayor of the newly formed municipality.

The municipal court also included deputy mayor Arrigo Kurz (ÖVP) and the town treasurer Martin Übelher (SPÖ), both from Waldbach.

Until 31 December 2014, Andreas Riegler (ÖVP) in town Waldbach and Josef Freiberger (ÖVP), in the town Mönichwald, were the incumbent mayors. In the merger of the municipalities, there was at first no mayor. Thereby in protest against the merger, none of the former town politicians were to be mayor, and from the Landesregierung Steiermark with Franz Schröck, a Mitarbeiter of the Hartberg-Fürstenfeld, was installed as interim commissioner. This had led to the resulting duties until the election of the mayor during the inaugural meeting of the Municipal Council.

Municipal council 
The municipal council consists of 15 members.  After the results of the 2015 election, the council convened with the following members:
 8 Mandate ÖVP,
 4 Mandate SPÖ and
 3 Mandate FPÖ.
At the session of the town council, the groups of both former municipalities were there, with eight members from Waldbach and seven from Mönichwald.

The prior elections brought the following results:

Demographics

References

External links 

 Gemeinde Waldbach-Mönichwald: official Internet page (accessed on 27 May 2015).

Cities and towns in Hartberg-Fürstenfeld District